Tommy's Troubles was a British football themed comic strip which ran for ten years in the Roy of the Rovers comic and which is still fondly remembered by fans of the "golden age" of British sports-themed comics. The strip debuted in the very first issue of Roy of the Rovers, dated 25 September 1976, and, apart from a break of approximately three months in 1985, ran until a re-launch of the comic in 1986 saw most of the existing strips replaced, by which time it was the only remaining story from the comic's original line-up apart from the story of Roy himself. The final episode appeared in the issue dated 16 August 1986. The strip was usually written by Fred Baker and drawn by Ramiro Bujeiro. Episodes also appeared in many of the Roy of the Rovers annuals.

Story overview
The story centred on teenager Tommy Barnes, who longed to be a professional footballer but had the misfortune to be sent to Crowhust School, where only rugby was played. After a concerted campaign by Tommy and his pal Ginger Collins, the headmaster agreed to allow a school football team to be formed on the condition that Tommy was able to get into the school rugby team, which he eventually did.

Later, Tommy and Ginger formed their own football club, Barnes United, and entered a local league. They persuaded the local council to allow them the use of some disused tennis courts, where they laid their own pitch and built their own clubhouse. Tommy and his team were frequently beset by all manner of "troubles", such as not being able to raise a team or having to hitch-hike to away games as they could not afford public transport. They also made enemies of two of Crowhurst's top rugby players, the conniving Adam Waller and his slow-witted sidekick Cyril Swate. Waller and Swate spent most of their time orchestrating various schemes to make Tommy and his teammates' lives miserable, although Waller invariably got his come-uppance. A memorable storyline of this type saw United enter a team in a five-a-side tournament, prompting Waller to enter a team of tough rugby players, his plan being to rough up the United players. The United players' superior skills nonetheless allowed them to defeat the rugby players without great difficulty, and Waller ended up having to pay the tournament fees for his entire team.

The end of the original run
In the summer of 1985, however, Waller finally got the better of Tommy when he managed to persuade the local council that Barnes United had disbanded, with the result that the council gave the use of their pitch to a girls' hockey team. Facing expulsion from the league without a ground on which to play, Tommy learned of a long-disused ground on the edge of town which had once been used by a local non-league team. The United players took over the ground and renovated it, allowing them to begin the new league season. After just a couple of matches, however, the owner of the land on which the ground stood made his presence known, and ordered the team to vacate it. At the same time Tommy learnt that his father's job had been relocated and he would have to move to a different part of the country. With the other players feeling that Barnes United could not continue without him, Tommy left them with a parting message of "Never let your troubles get you down" and the strip came to an end.

The strip's return
Just a few months later, however, the strip made a return, apparently by popular demand. It was revealed that Barnes United had decided to continue after all after being allowed the use of a field by a local farmer. Without Tommy, however, they were rooted to the bottom of the league and the farmer would not allow them anything other than run-down old sheds in which to change. Just before Christmas, however, Tommy returned, having moved back to Crowhurst for reasons which were not made clear. He made his return to the Barnes United team wearing a mask and calling himself "The Masked Avenger", so as to allow for a dramatic unmasking at the end of the first episode.

The strip's second run followed the same tone as the first, mixing on-field action with Tommy and his friends' various off-field "scrapes", which were usually engineered by Waller and Swate. United lost another ground when the farmer developed its facilities and then gave its use to a men's team, but they found and renovated yet another ground, financing the work via a 24-hour sponsored penalty shootout. The strip came to an end in 1986 with a final storyline in which Tommy's teammates came to believe that he was contemplating quitting football, but in the final episode he revealed that he'd always be playing football, whatever his "troubles".

References

Fictional association football players
British comics